On the Road is an album by Art Farmer recorded in Los Angeles in 1976 and originally released on the Contemporary label.

Reception

Scott Yanow of Allmusic states, "Everyone plays up to par on this spirited straight-ahead set".

Track listing
 "Downwind" (Hampton Hawes) - 7:30
 "My Funny Valentine" (Lorenz Hart, Richard Rodgers) - 6:57	
 "Namely You" (Gene DePaul, Johnny Mercer) - 6:51
 "What Am I Here For?" (Duke Ellington, Frankie Laine) - 6:46	
 "I Can't Get Started" (Vernon Duke, Ira Gershwin) - 7:30	
 "Will You Still Be Mine?" (Tom Adair, Matt Dennis) - 5:39

Personnel
Art Farmer - flugelhorn
Art Pepper - alto saxophone (tracks 1, 3, 4 & 6)
Hampton Hawes - piano
Ray Brown - bass (tracks 1 & 3–6)
Steve Ellington (tracks 1, 3 & 5), Shelly Manne (tracks 4 & 6) - drums

References 

Contemporary Records albums
Art Farmer albums
1976 albums